Connecticut's 17th House of Representatives district elects one member of the Connecticut House of Representatives. It consists of the town of Canton and part of Avon. It has been represented by Democrat Eleni Kavros DeGraw since 2021.

Recent Elections

2020

2018

2016

2014

2012

References

17